Fadrique Enríquez de Mendoza (1390 – 23 December 1473) was the second Admiral of Castile, Count of Melgar and Rueda, and second Lord of Medina del Rioseco. He was a son of Alonso Enríquez, the first admiral of Castile.

1426-1445 
Fadrique's father, Alonso Enríquez, was the son of Fadrique, an illegitimate child of Alfonso XI of Castile.  The Enríquez family was an important family because of this descent from the royal line and their many possessions in Castile.  When his father died in 1429, Alonso Fadrique inherited his estate and titles, including ricohombre, Master of Order of Santiago, lord of Medina de Rioseco, Castro Verde and Torrelobatón.  According to his contemporary Hernando del Pulgar (1436–1492), he was small in stature, a little nearsighted, and he gained much honor and fame with his performance as commander of the fleet of Castile.

Fadrique played an important role at court as one of the main advisers of King John II of Castile. He became involved in the conspiracy against the influential Constable of Castile Álvaro de Luna.

In 1426, Fadrique Enríquez married Mariana Fernández de Córdoba y Ayala, 4th Lady of Casarrubios (1385–1431). In 1425, Mariana gave birth to a daughter, Juana, Queen of Aragon.

In 1431, he and Alvaro de Luna arrested Commander Diego Sarmiento because the latter did not obey the orders of the king.  In the same year, his wife Mariana died.

In 1432, he fought alongside Pedro Manrique de Lara against the princes Henry and Peter near Cáceres, Alburquerque and Acagala.

On May 9, 1432, Fadrique married his second wife, Teresa Fernández de Quiñones, with whom he had nine children.

In 1437, when  King John II of Castile had Pedro Manrique arrested, Fadrique came into conflict with the king.  In August 1438, Pedro managed to escape from his prison in Fuentedueñas.  Fadrique gathered troops in Medina de Rioseco to rebel against the king. John II of Castile also brought together his supporters, including Alvaro de Luna, his son Henry, Pero de Velasco, the Count of Haro, Diego Gómez de Sandoval and others.  In 1440, negotiations were held and a temporary truce was agreed on.  During this short period of peace, Henry married Blanche II of Navarre, and Fadrique was godfather of the couple.

1445-1473 
In 1445, Fadrique again participated in an alliance against Alvaro de Luna.  The admiral was captured but managed to escape to Medina de Rioseco.

In 1448, Fadrique was accused of a conspiracy against the king and a plot to murder Álvaro de Luna.  Fadrique fled again, went to Aragon to seek support and thence to Italy, where Alfonso V, king of Aragon was at the time.

In 1449, an alliance against Álvaro de Luna was again forged.  This time, Fadrique joined forces with John II, king of Navarre.  In 1447, John II of Castile had married Isabella of Portugal.  The new queen soon made short shrift of the influential nobles at court.  Álvaro was arrested on April 4, 1453, and sentenced to death.  He was beheaded on June 2, 1453.

John II of Castile died in July 1454 and was succeeded by Henry IV.  A new series of intrigues at the court of Castile began, and Fadrique again played a role.

Fadrique Enríquez de Mendoza died in 1473 and was buried in the monastery of Our Lady of Hope of Valdescopezo in Medina de Rioseco.

Issue 
With Mariana Fernández de Córdoba:
 Juana Enríquez, later Queen of Aragon and mother of Ferdinand II of Aragon

With Teresa Fernández de Quiñones:
 Alonso Enríquez (1435-1485), 3rd Admiral of Castile
 Pedro, fourth Adelantado Mayor of Andalusia (? - 1492)
 Enrique Enríquez (? - 1504), major-domo mayor del rey, lord of Orso. Father of Maria  Enriquez de Luna and great grandfather of Saint Francis Borgia, 4th Duke of Gandía.
 Francisco Enriques
 María, married García Álvarez de Toledo, 1st Duke of Alba and great grandmother of Eleanor of Toledo, consort of Cosimo I de' Medici, Grand Duke of Tuscany
 Leonor
 Inés
 Aldonza, married Juan Ramón Folch IV de Cardona
 Blanca

References 

1390 births
1473 deaths
Castilian nobility
Counts of Spain